In The Tail of a Comet is Dozer's first full album, released April 25, 2000 on Man's Ruin Records.  It was recorded in February 1999 at the Rockhouse Studio in Borlänge, Sweden for about $500.  All songs were mixed and produced by Dozer with Bengt Backe.

Track listing
"Supersoul"  - 2:44
"Lightyears Ahead"  - 5:13
"Speeder"  - 3:51
"Inside the Falcon"  - 3:59
"Riding The Machine"  - 3:51
"Cupola"  - 2:03
"Grand Dragon"  - 5:54
"Captain Spaceheart"  - 3:40
"High Roller"  - 6:01

Personnel 

 Fredrik Nordin (Vocals, Rhythm Guitar)
 Tommi Holappa (Lead Guitar)
 Johan Rockner (Bass guitar)
 Erik Bäckwall (Drums)

Critical Reception

Critical reception was generally mixed with a lean towards the positive. AllMusic noted it was more reminiscent of Metallica than the genre-defining Black Sabbath, and "falls short of exceptional, but it's a satisfying effort that has more plusses than minuses."

CMJ Music Review was generally positive, indicating it was a strong visceral experience and a promising debut album, although it lacked musical depth.

References

Dozer albums
2000 albums
Man's Ruin Records albums